"Decadent & Desperate" is the second single released by Norwegian industrial-rock solo artist Mortiis from the album The Grudge. It includes the previously unreleased track Underdog, along with various remixes and live songs not taken from the album. All versions were numbered limited editions. The music video shows Mortiis both with, and without his prosthetic make-up.

Track listing
Digipack CD version
"Decadent & Desperate" - 3:24
"Underdog" - 4:19
"Gibber (gibbering idiot)" - 3:51
Red/Green cover vinyl
"Decadent & Desperate" - 4:28
"Parasite God (live in London)" - 6:01
Exclusive iTunes tracks
"Decadent & Desperate" - 3:24
"Way Too Wicked (Absinthium Mix)" - 4:33

2005 singles
Mortiis songs
2005 songs